Samart Payakaroon, real name Samart Tiptarmai (born 5 December 1962, in the Klong Khet village in the Chachoengsao province, Thailand), is a former Muay Thai fighter, professional boxer and entertainer. He is considered by many to be the greatest Muay Thai fighter of all time, becoming a multiple time Lumpinee Stadium champion, as well as a WBC world champion in boxing. He also went on to have an entertainment career, releasing several successful music albums in Thailand and appearing in several films.

Fighting career

Muay Thai
Samart has an older brother, Kongtoranee Payakaroon, who induced Samart to start training in Muay Thai. Samart started training Muay Thai when he was 7 years old. The First Muay Thai teacher of Samart was Yodtong Senanan (Kru Tui) who taught both Samart and Kongtoranee. His first fight name was Samart Lookklongket. After he fought about a dozen fights, he came to Bangkok to fight at Lumpinee Stadium in 1978.

He possessed an extremely high fight IQ, lightning quick reflexes, and excellent ring vision. Samart also fought using creative techniques that were effective and unpredictable, even against elite competition in the 80s and 90s (dubbed the Golden Age of Muay Thai). There were contests where Samart was pushed past the brink of exhaustion, and still gave his opponents the fight of their lives. Even in the period where Samart was more concerned about his music and acting career, he defeated some of the greatest fighters of his generation.

Boxing
In 1982, he turned to boxing where he fought from a southpaw stance. In 1986, he won a WBC junior featherweight title with a surprise KO over rock-chinned Lupe Pintor in the fifth round and defended against the respected Juan Meza before being stopped by undefeated Australian Jeff Fenech. He made a comeback in the 1990s and challenged unsuccessfully for another world title.

Payakaroon was named The Rings Progress of the Year fighter for 1986. He now teaches Muay Thai in Thailand.

Titles and accomplishmentsMuay ThaiLumpinee Stadium 1980 Lumpinee Stadium 102 lbs Champion
 1980 Lumpinee Stadium 105 lbs Champion
 1981 Lumpinee Stadium 115 lbs Champion
 1981 Lumpinee Stadium 126 lbs ChampionAwards 1981 Sports Writers Association of Thailand Fighter of the Year
 1981 Sports Writers Association of Thailand Fight of the Year (vs Mafuang Weerapol)
 1982 Sports Writers Association of Thailand Fight of the Year (vs Dieselnoi Chor Thanasukarn)
 1983 Sports Writers Association of Thailand Fighter of the Year
 1988 Sports Writers Association of Thailand Fight of the Year (vs Panomtuanlek Hapalang)
 1988 Sports Writers Association of Thailand Fighter of the Year
 2022 WBC Diamond Belt - Otorgado por Bang Rajan Events en Madrid - España en reconocimiento a su extraordinaria trayectoria. Bang Rajan EventsBoxingWorld Boxing Council World Boxing Council World Super Bantamweight Champion (1986)

Entertainment

Music
Between his two stints as boxing champion, Samart signed with a Grammy Entertainment winning label and released three albums. They are pop music but with his upcountry accent ('"Ner" เหน่อ) as opposed to central Thailand accent. His first album, Rock Ner Ner. (ร็อคเหน่อๆ) in 1989, contains a famous song On Som (อ่อนซ้อม - not enough practice) talking about him being very proficient in boxing but lacking the same aptitude at getting love from women. His second and third album, Arom Dee (อารมณ์ดี) and Kun Mai Kun Mike (คันไม้คันไมค์) followed in 1990 and 1992 with famous songs Nam Plik Pla Too (น้ำพริกปลาทู) and Kao Ao Eng (เกาเอาเอง) respectively.
After the three albums, he went back to boxing.

Acting
In 2000, Samart starred as a minor antagonist named Chartchai Payakaroon in A Fighter's Blues. He had a role in the 2001 Thai film, The Legend of Suriyothai. He had a major role in the French drama film, Fureur, and was in the 2004 film, The Bodyguard. In 2006, he co-starred in the Thai martial arts film, Dynamite Warrior. He appeared in Muay Thai Chaiya in 2007.

In 2015, his biography has created a documentary film released in Mard Payak (มาดพยัคฆ์; "Tiger Style") by NOW26 in a network of Nation Multimedia Group.

Legacy
Samart is considered to be the "Muhammad Ali" and "Sugar Ray Robinson" of Muay Thai. His name holds prestige for followers of the sport to this day.

Many modern day fighters, such as Saekson Janjira, Matee Jedeepitek, Kongnapa Kansaek Sor Ploenjit, Lookchang, and Nokweed all look up to Samart and aspire to be like him.

 Professional Boxing Record 
 Professional boxing record 

Muay Thai record

|-  style="background:#fbb;"
| 2001-01-20|| Loss ||align=left| Varazdat Mihranyan ||  Muay Thai combat - Sidekick Promotion || Inglewood, California, US || Decision || 5 || 3:00
|-  style="background:#cfc;"
|  || Win ||align=left| Maikel Lieuwfat ||  || Thailand || Decision || 5 || 3:00
|-  style="background:#cfc;"
| 1993-12-10 || Win ||align=left| Paul Lenehan || || France || TKO || 3 || 2:40
|-  style="background:#cfc;"
| 1993-12-05 || Win ||align=left| Gilbert Ballantine || King's Birthday || Bangkok, Thailand || Decision || 5 || 3:00
|-  style="background:#cfc;"
| 1993-10-02 || Win ||align=left| Murat Comert ||  || Paris, France || TKO || 3 ||
|-  style="background:#cfc;"
| 1993-04-24 || Win ||align=left| Satoshi Niizuma || MAJKF || Tokyo, Japan || Decision (Unanimous)|| 5 || 3:00
|-  style="background:#FFBBBB;"
| 1989-05-10 || Loss ||align=left| Wangchannoi Sor Palangchai || Lumpinee Stadium  || Bangkok, Thailand || Decision || 5 || 3:00
|-  style="background:#cfc;"
| 1989-01-06 || Win ||align=left| Jaroenthong Kiatbanchong || Lumpinee Stadium || Bangkok, Thailand || KO (Right hook) || 1 ||
|-  style="background:#cfc;"
| 1988-12-02 || Win ||align=left| Namphon Nongkeepahuyuth || Lumpinee Stadium || Bangkok, Thailand || Decision || 5 || 3:00
|-  style="background:#cfc;"
| 1988-10-28 || Win ||align=left| Namphon Nongkeepahuyuth || Lumpinee Stadium || Bangkok, Thailand || TKO (Doctor Stoppage) || 3 ||
|-  style="background:#cfc;"
| 1988-06-24 || Win ||align=left| Samransak Muangsurin || Lumpinee Stadium || Bangkok, Thailand || Decision || 5 || 3:00
|-  style="background:#cfc;"
| 1988-05-26 || Win||align=left| Samransak Muangsurin || Lumpinee Stadium || Bangkok, Thailand || Decision || 5 || 3:00
|-  style="background:#cfc;"
| 1988-01-26 || Win ||align=left| Panomtuanlek Hapalang || Lumpinee Stadium || Bangkok, Thailand || KO (Punches) || 1 ||
|-  style="background:#cfc;"
| 1984-09-21 || Win ||align=left| Wattana Soudareth ||  || Paris, France || TKO || 4 ||
|-  style="background:#cfc;"
| 1983-12-28 || Win ||align=left| Samart Prasarnmit || Rajadamnern Stadium (133 lbs)|| Bangkok, Thailand ||  Decision || 5 || 3:00
|-
! style=background:white colspan=9 |
|-  style="background:#cfc;"
| 1983-11-11 || Win ||align=left| Chamuakpetch Haphalung || Lumpinee Stadium || Bangkok, Thailand || Decision || 5 || 3:00
|-  style="background:#cfc;"
| 1983-10-13 || Win ||align=left| Rachabut Sor Thanikul || Rajadamnern Stadium || Bangkok, Thailand || Decision || 5 || 3:00
|-  style="background:#cfc;"
| 1983-08-24 || Win ||align=left| Kitty Sor Thanikul || Rajadamnern Stadium || Bangkok, Thailand || Decision || 5 || 3:00
|-  style="background:#cfc;"
| 1983-04-05 || Win ||align=left| Samransak Muangsurin || Lumpinee Stadium || Bangkok, Thailand || Decision || 5 || 3:00 
|-
! style=background:white colspan=9 |
|-  style="background:#cfc;"
| 1983-02-04 || Win ||align=left| Samingnoom Sithiboontham || Lumpinee Stadium || Bangkok, Thailand || Decision || 5 || 3:00
|-  style="background:#FFBBBB;"
| 1982-12-24 || Loss ||align=left| Dieselnoi Chor Thanasukarn || Rajadamnern Stadium || Bangkok, Thailand || Decision || 5 || 3:00
|-  style="background:#cfc;"
| 1982-05-10|| Win ||align=left| Padejsuk Pitsanurachan || Rajadamnern Stadium || Bangkok, Thailand || Decision || 5 || 3:00
|-  style="background:#cfc;"
| 1982-03-12|| Win ||align=left| Padejsuk Pitsanurachan || Lumpinee Stadium || Bangkok, Thailand || Decision || 5 || 3:00
|-  style="background:#cfc;"
| 1982-01-15|| Win ||align=left| Nongkhai Sor.Prapatsorn || Lumpinee Stadium || Bangkok, Thailand || Decision || 5 || 3:00
|-  style="background:#cfc;"
| 1981-11-09|| Win ||align=left| Kitty Sor Thanikul || Rajadamnern Stadium || Bangkok, Thailand || Decision || 5 || 3:00
|-  style="background:#cfc;"
| 1981-10-13|| Win ||align=left| Samingnoom Sithiboontham || Lumpinee Stadium || Bangkok, Thailand || Decision || 5 || 3:00 
|-
! style=background:white colspan=9 |
|-  style="background:#cfc;"
| 1981-09-04|| Win ||align=left| Paruhat Longnoen || Lumpinee Stadium || Bangkok, Thailand || Decision || 5 || 3:00
|-  style="background:#cfc;"
| 1981-06-09|| Win ||align=left| Mafuang Weerapol || Lumpinee Stadium || Bangkok, Thailand || Decision || 5 || 3:00
|-  style="background:#cfc;"
| 1981-04-28|| Win ||align=left| Fonluang Luksadetmaepuanthong || Lumpinee Stadium || Bangkok, Thailand || Decision || 5 || 3:00
|-  style="background:#cfc;"
| 1981-03-31|| Win ||align=left| Singthong Prasopchai || Lumpinee Stadium || Bangkok, Thailand || Decision || 5 || 3:00 
|-
! style=background:white colspan=9 |
|-  style="background:#cfc;"
| 1981-01-13|| Win ||align=left| Poollap Saknirun || Lumpinee Stadium || Bangkok, Thailand || Decision || 5 || 3:00
|-  style="background:#cfc;"
| 1980-12-02|| Win ||align=left| Chamuakpetch Haphalung || Lumpinee Stadium || Bangkok, Thailand || Decision || 5 || 3:00
|-  style="background:#cfc;"
| 1980-11-11|| Win ||align=left| Poollap Saknirun || Lumpinee Stadium || Bangkok, Thailand || Decision || 5 || 3:00 
|-
! style=background:white colspan=9 |
|-  style="background:#cfc;"
| 1980-10-14|| Win ||align=left| Hanuman Sitporluang || Lumpinee Stadium || Bangkok, Thailand || Decision || 5 || 3:00
|-  style="background:#cfc;"
| 1980-09-23|| Win ||align=left| Bangkhlanoi Sor.Thanikul || Lumpinee Stadium || Bangkok, Thailand || Decision || 5 || 3:00
|- style="background:#c5d2ea;"
|1980-09-05
|NC
| align="left" | Jampatong Na Nontachai
|Lumpinee Stadium
|Bangkok, Thailand
|Referee stoppage
|4
|3:00
|-  style="background:#FFBBBB;"
| 1980-08-08|| Loss ||align=left| Chamuakpetch Haphalung || Lumpinee Stadium || Bangkok, Thailand || Decision || 5 || 3:00 
|-
! style=background:white colspan=9 |
|-  style="background:#fbb;"
| 1980-06-27|| Loss ||align=left| Bangkhlanoi Sor.Thanikul || Lumpinee Stadium || Bangkok, Thailand || Decision || 5 || 3:00
|-  style="background:#cfc;"
| 1980-06-06|| Win ||align=left| Paruhatlek Sitchunthong || Lumpinee Stadium || Bangkok, Thailand || Decision || 5 || 3:00
|-
! style=background:white colspan=9 |
|-  style="background:#cfc;"
| 1980-04-29|| Win ||align=left| Prabpipop Lukklongtan || Lumpinee Stadium || Bangkok, Thailand || Decision || 5 || 3:00
|-  style="background:#cfc;"
| 1980-03-28|| Win ||align=left| Sonsil Sit.Nerpayong || Lumpinee Stadium || Bangkok, Thailand || Decision || 5 || 3:00
|-  style="background:#cfc;"
| 1980-03-14|| Win ||align=left| Paruhatlek Sitchunthong || || Pattaya, Thailand || Decision || 5 || 3:00
|-  style="background:#cfc;"
| 1980-02-11|| Win ||align=left| Kongsamut Sor Thanikul || Lumpinee Stadium || Bangkok, Thailand || Decision || 5 || 3:00 
|-
! style=background:white colspan=9 |
|-  style="background:#c5d2ea;"
| 1979-12-30|| Draw||align=left| Sichanglek Look K.M-6 || Lumpinee Stadium || Bangkok, Thailand ||Decision || 5 || 3:00
|-  style="background:#cfc;"
| 1979-12-02|| Win ||align=left| Praseurtsak Singthapraya ||  || Sa Kaeo Province, Thailand ||KO || 1 ||
|-  style="background:#cfc;"
| 1979-11-02|| Win ||align=left| Chaowalit Sitpraprom || Lumpinee Stadium || Bangkok, Thailand ||Decision || 5 || 3:00
|-  style="background:#FFBBBB;"
| 1979-08-17|| Loss ||align=left| Paruhatlek Sitchunthong || Lumpinee Stadium || Bangkok, Thailand || KO || 3 ||
|-  style="background:#FFBBBB;"
| 1979-06-26|| Loss ||align=left| Jampatong Na Nontachai|| Lumpinee Stadium || Bangkok, Thailand || Decision || 5 || 3:00
|-  style="background:#FFBBBB;"
| 1979-06-08|| Loss ||align=left| Jampatong Na Nontachai|| Lumpinee Stadium || Bangkok, Thailand || Decision || 5 || 3:00
|-  style="background:#cfc;"
| 1979-03-23|| Win ||align=left| Saksuriya Fairtex || Rajadamnern Stadium || Bangkok, Thailand ||Decision || 5 || 3:00
|-  style="background:#c5d2ea;"
| 1979-02-25|| Draw||align=left| Pharuatlek Sitchunthong || Lumpinee Stadium || Bangkok, Thailand ||Decision || 5 || 3:00
|-  style="background:#cfc;"
| 1979-02-13|| Win ||align=left| Sichanglek Look KM-16 || Lumpinee Stadium || Bangkok, Thailand ||Decision || 5 || 3:00
|-  style="background:#cfc;"
| 1979-01-01|| Win ||align=left| Chaowalit Sitpraprom ||  || Sa Kaeo Province, Thailand ||Decision || 5 || 3:00

|-  style="background:#cfc;"
| 1978-11-20|| Win ||align=left| Sichanglek Look K.M-6 || Rajadamnern Stadium || Bangkok, Thailand ||Decision || 5 || 3:00

|-  style="background:#cfc;"
| 1978-08-06|| Win ||align=left| Payakmok Surakosang || Rajadamnern Stadium || Bangkok, Thailand ||Decision || 5 || 3:00
|-  style="background:#cfc;"
| 1978-07-20|| Win ||align=left| Saengpetch Sor. Wongsiam ||  || Chanthaburi Province, Thailand ||Decision || 5 || 3:00
|-  style="background:#cfc;"
| 1978-07-03|| Win ||align=left| Aunhain Lookbanplai ||  || Mae Hong Son Province, Thailand ||Decision || 5 || 3:00
|-  style="background:#fbb;"
| 1978-05-23|| Loss||align=left| Thaninoi Sakniran || Lumpinee Stadium 100 lbs || Bangkok, Thailand ||Decision || 5 || 3:00
|-  style="background:#cfc;"
| 1978-05-05|| Win ||align=left| Gakao Sitchuchai ||  || Sam Yan, Thailand ||Decision || 5 || 3:00
|-  style="background:#cfc;"
| 1978-04-23|| Win ||align=left| Pornchai Sithaosing ||  || Pong District, Thailand ||KO || 2 ||
|-  style="background:#cfc;"
| 1978-04-15|| Win ||align=left| Sampownoi Janjira ||  || Ratchaburi Province, Thailand ||KO || 3 ||
|-  style="background:#cfc;"
| 1978-04-03|| Win ||align=left| Kiatwiwath Lookchaimai ||  || Rayong Province, Thailand ||KO || 4 ||
|-  style="background:#fbb;"
| 1978-03-27|| Loss ||align=left| Awout Sor. Thanikhul  ||  || Nonthaburi Province, Thailand ||Decision || 5 || 3:00
|-  style="background:#cfc;"
| 1978-03-02|| Win ||align=left| Maewnoi Singtchakawan ||  || Samrong District, Thailand ||Decision || 5 || 3:00
|-  style="background:#cfc;"
| 1978-02-19|| Win ||align=left| Jokceynoi Por. Muang U-bon ||  || Phanat Nikhom District, Thailand ||Decision || 5 || 3:00
|-  style="background:#fbb;"
| 1978-02-01|| Loss ||align=left| Thaninoi Saknilan  ||  || Chanthaburi Province, Thailand ||Decision || 5 || 3:00
|-  style="background:#fbb;"
| 1978-01-18|| Loss ||align=left| Leungchai Thairungruang  ||  || Chonburi Province, Thailand ||Decision || 5 || 3:00
|-  style="background:#fbb;"
| 1977-12-13|| Loss ||align=left| Payom Chokchaisith  ||  || Chai Nat Province, Thailand ||Decision || 5 || 3:00
|-  style="background:#cfc;"
| 1977-08-04|| Win ||align=left| Cheugchai Sithseri  ||  || Ban Bueng District, Thailand ||KO || 3 ||
|-  style="background:#cfc;"
| 1977-06-20|| Win ||align=left| Sittichai Sanangym ||  || Phanat Nikhom District, Thailand ||Decision || 5 || 3:00
|-  style="background:#cfc;"
| 1977-03-19|| Win ||align=left| Sittichai Sanangym ||  || Pak Kret District, Thailand ||Decision || 5 || 3:00
|-  style="background:#cfc;"
| 1977-01-24|| Win ||align=left| Saksuriya Fairtex ||  || Nakhon Pathom Province, Thailand ||Decision || 5 || 3:00
|-  style="background:#cfc;"
| 1976-12-01|| Win ||align=left| Chattamin Sithpratana ||  || Kalasin Province, Thailand || KO || 1 ||
|-  style="background:#cfc;"
| 1976-10-30|| Win ||align=left| Pongkramnoi Sor. Kingstar ||  || Roi Et Province, Thailand || Decision || 5 || 3:00
|-  style="background:#cfc;"
| 1976-07-12|| Win ||align=left| Awout Sor. Thanikhul||  || Phitsanulok, Thailand || Decision || 5 || 3:00
|-  style="background:#cfc;"
| 1976-07-12|| Win ||align=left| Pornsawan Sitsuwan ||  || Nakhon Ratchasima, Thailand || KO || 1 ||
|-  style="background:#cfc;"
| 1976-03-03|| Win ||align=left| Payak Lookmakramkou ||  || Pattaya, Thailand || KO || 1 ||
|-  style="background:#cfc;"
| 1976-02-19|| Win ||align=left| Nomtanong Sitsaengsawang ||  || Kanchanaburi, Thailand || KO || 2 ||
|-  style="background:#cfc;"
| 1976-01-07|| Win ||align=left| Sama-air Sitsamrith ||  || Nakhon Ratchasima, Thailand || KO || 2 ||
|-  style="background:#cfc;"
| 1976-01-02|| Win ||align=left| Koukong Sor. Sawangtith ||  || Samrong District, Thailand || Decision || 5 || 3:00
|-  style="background:#cfc;"
| 1976-01-07|| Win ||align=left| Sama-air Sitsamrith ||  || Bangkok, Thailand || KO || 2 ||
|-  style="background:#cfc;"
| 1975-12-|| Win ||align=left| Pinchai Singbanlao||  || Bangkok, Thailand || Decision || 5 || 3:00
|-  style="background:#cfc;"
| 1975-12-|| Win ||align=left|  Somyoth Lookchaomai ||  || Trat Province, Thailand || KO || 2 ||
|-  style="background:#cfc;"
| 1975-12-10|| Win ||align=left| Petchmani Lookbanlao ||  || Trat Province, Thailand || Decision || 5 || 3:00
|-  style="background:#cfc;"
| 1975-12-04|| Win ||align=left| Pounsak Sitworawath ||  || Chanthaburi Province, Thailand || KO || 1 ||
|-  style="background:#cfc;"
| 1975-11-20|| Win ||align=left| Uangfah Sittrangloig||  || Chanthaburi Province, Thailand || KO || 3 ||
|-  style="background:#cfc;"
| 1975-11-12|| Win ||align=left|  Bangsai Sitsaithong ||  || Rayong, Thailand || Decision || 5 || 3:00
|-  style="background:#cfc;"
| 1975-10-27|| Win ||align=left|  Panetchone Lookbanprao ||  || Lat Phrao District, Thailand || KO || 4 ||
|-  style="background:#cfc;"
| 1975-10-26|| Win ||align=left| Thaksin Lookkraosaming ||  || Trat Province, Thailand || KO || 3 ||
|-  style="background:#cfc;"
| 1975-10-04|| Win ||align=left| Surasak Sakpraseurt ||  || Trat Province, Thailand || Decision || 5 || 3:00
|-  style="background:#cfc;"
| 1975-09-30|| Win ||align=left| Ayduan Hatari ||  || Bang Lamung District, Thailand || Decision || 5 || 3:00
|-  style="background:#cfc;"
| 1975-09-20|| Win ||align=left| Thanoukranong Latsaminaga ||  || Trat Province, Thailand || KO || 3 ||
|-  style="background:#cfc;"
| 1975-08-31|| Win ||align=left| Koukong Sor. Sawangtith ||  || Bang Lamung District, Thailand || Decision || 5 || 3:00
|-  style="background:#cfc;"
| 1975-08-17|| Win ||align=left| Kao Sor. Bantchongsak ||  || Trat Province, Thailand || KO || 2 ||
|-  style="background:#cfc;"
| 1975-08-07|| Win ||align=left| Chaowalit Sitpraprom ||  || Bang Lamung District, Thailand || KO || 1 ||
|-  style="background:#fbb;"
| 1975-05-05|| Loss ||align=left| Bangkhlanoi Sor.Thanikul ||  || Samrong District, Thailand || Decision || 5 || 3:00
|-  style="background:#fbb;"
| 1975-03-29|| Loss ||align=left| Thai Looksamet ||  || Thailand || Decision || 5 || 3:00
|-  style="background:#cfc;"
| 1975-02-29|| Win ||align=left| Chaowalit Sitpraprom||  || Bangkok, Thailand || Decision || 5 || 3:00
|-  style="background:#cfc;"
| 1975-02-10|| Win||align=left| Tchongdi Srisopa ||  || Ayutthaya Province, Thailand || Decision || 5 || 3:00
|-  style="background:#cfc;"
| 1975-01-19|| Win||align=left| Chamnaseuk Na.Pattaya ||  || Ban Khai District, Thailand || Decision || 5 || 3:00
|-  style="background:#fbb;"
| 1975-01-10|| Loss ||align=left| Thai Looksamet ||  || Bang Lamung District, Thailand || Decision || 5 || 3:00
|-  style="background:#fbb;"
| 1975-01-02|| Loss ||align=left| Thongchainoi Sitkrulam ||  || Thailand || Decision || 5 || 3:00
|-  style="background:#cfc;"
| 1974-12-09|| Win||align=left| Chatchai Na. Bankrod ||  || Bang Lamung District, Thailand || KO || 4 ||
|-  style="background:#cfc;"
| 1974-11-21|| Win||align=left| Singdam Lookhinnawong ||  || Pattaya, Thailand || Decision || 5 || 3:00
|-  style="background:#cfc;"
| 1974-10-16|| Win||align=left| Bangkhlanoi Sor.Thanikul ||  || Bang Lamung District, Thailand || Decision || 5 || 3:00
|-  style="background:#fbb;"
| 1974-09-03|| Loss ||align=left| Thai Looksamet ||  || Chonburi Province, Thailand || Decision || 5 || 3:00
|-  style="background:#cfc;"
| 1974-08-19|| Win||align=left| Pandeg Sor. Nuanhanan  ||  || Phetchaburi Province, Thailand || Decision || 5 || 3:00
|-  style="background:#fbb;"
| 1974-07-31|| Loss ||align=left| Thongdeg Sor. Lackana ||  || Bang Lamung District, Thailand || Decision || 5 || 3:00
|-  style="background:#cfc;"
| 1974-05-15|| Win ||align=left| Chaowalit Sitpraprom ||  || Bang Lamung District, Thailand || Decision || 5 || 3:00
|-  style="background:#c5d2ea;"
| 1974-04-16|| Draw ||align=left| Chatchai Na. Bankrod ||  || Bang Lamung District, Thailand || Decision || 5 || 3:00
|-  style="background:#cfc;"
| 1974-03-13|| Win||align=left|  Thongdeg Sor. Lackana  ||  || Bang Lamung District, Thailand || Decision || 5 || 3:00
|-  style="background:#cfc;"
| 1974-03-13|| Win||align=left| Kenoi Latsamijan ||  || Bang Lamung District, Thailand || Decision || 5 || 3:00
|-  style="background:#fbb;"
| 1974-02-25|| Loss ||align=left| Thongdeg Sor. Lackana ||  || Bang Lamung District, Thailand || Decision || 5 || 3:00
|-  style="background:#fbb;"
| 1974-01-31|| Loss ||align=left| Saenkanong Sitkruchip ||  || Chonburi Province, Thailand || Decision || 5 || 3:00
|-  style="background:#cfc;"
| 1974-01-27|| Win ||align=left| Chaowalit Sitpraprom ||  || Bang Lamung District, Thailand || KO || 1 ||
|-  style="background:#cfc;"
| 1974-01-19|| Win ||align=left| Saekson Janjira ||  || Bang Lamung District, Thailand || KO || 1 ||
|-  style="background:#cfc;"
| 1974-01-04|| Win ||align=left| Saekson Janjira ||  || Pattaya, Thailand || Decision || 5 || 3:00 
|-
! style=background:white colspan=9 |
|-  style="background:#cfc;"
| 1972-|| Win ||align=left| Petaroon Sitnimit ||  || Thailand || Decision || 5 || 3:00 
|-
! style=background:white colspan=9 |
|-
| colspan=9 | Legend'':    

Filmography
Television dramas
 2000  (ตี๋ใหญ่) (RS/Ch.3) as Chod (นายโชติ) 
 2001  (อตีตา) (Dida Video/Ch.7) as 
 2001  (ทองพูน โคกโพ ราษฎรเต็มขั้น) (/Ch.3) as Prasit (Dui) (ประสิทธิ์ (ดุ้ย))
 2001  (ส่วย สะท้านแผ่นดิน) (/ITV) as  
 2002  (จอมคนปล้นผ่าโลก) (/Ch.7) as 
 2003  (สืบตำรวจโทบุญถึง) (/Ch.7) as  
 2004  (สะใภ้ภูธร) (/Ch.3) as 
 2005  (บอดี้การ์ดแดดเดียว) (/Ch.3) as  
 2005  (ทางหลวงทางรัก) (/Ch.3) as 
 2006  (เพื่อนรักเพื่อนร้าย) (/Ch.7) as Kra Thong (กระทิง) 
 2006  (โก๊ะจ๋า ป่านะโก๊ะ) (/Ch.7) as Thong Bai (ทองใบ)
 2010  (ดิน น้ำ ลม ไฟ) (/Ch.3) as  
 2012  (หยกเลือดมังกร) (/Ch.7) as Kom Thoun (คมทวน)
 2013  (สุภาพบุรุษบ้านทุ่ง) (/Ch.7) as Kamnan Jeim (กำนันเจิม) 
 2013  (แม่ค้า) (/Ch.7) as Fahkamron (ฟ้าคำรณ)
 2014  (ลูกผู้ชายหัวใจเข้ม) (/Ch.7) as Kroo Khen (ครูเขต)
 2014  (เนตรนาคราช) (/Ch.7) as Lung Hin (Cameos) (ลุงหิน (รับเชิญ)) 
 2015  (จับกัง) (/Ch.7) as Lung Ang (ลุงอ่าง)
 2015  (เพื่อน-แพง) (/Ch.7) as Pu Yai Phan (ผู้ใหญ่ผาด)
 2015  (สิงห์รถบรรทุก) (/Ch.7) as  
 2016  (ฉันทนาสามช่า) (/Ch.7) as Thawib (ทวิป)
 2016  (ข้ามาคนเดียว) (/Ch.7) as Kammoun (คำม่วน)
 2017  (มือปืนพ่อลูกติด) (/Ch.7) as (Cameos) ((รับเชิญ)) 
 2017  (นายฮ้อยทมิฬ) (/Ch.7) as Thid Janta (ทิดจันทา) 
 2017  (มหาหิน) (/Ch.7) as Kroo Choung Kachin (ครูช่วง คเชนทร์) 
 2019  (เสียงเอื้อนสะเทือนดาว) (/One 31) as Thonkon Thaweewong (Kon) (Cameos) (ทองก้อน ทวีวงษ์ (ก้อน) (รับเชิญ))
 2019  (4 เทพผู้พิทักษ์) (/One 31) as Dr.Chok (หมอโชค)
 2020  (คนเหนือฅน) (/Ch.7) as Sou Phan (Cameos) (เสือผ่าน (รับเชิญ))
 2021 Dae Khun Pho Duai Khaeng Kwa (2021) (แด่คุณพ่อด้วยแข้งขวา) (Twin Flame/Thairath TV) as Thianchai (Kroo Thian) (เทียนชัย (ครูเทียน)) 
 2021 Talay Duerd (ทะเลเดือด) (/Ch.7) as Thongdee (ทองดี) 
 2021  (เผาขน) (/Ch.7) as Phu Pan (Cameos) (ผู้พัน (รับเชิญ)) 
 2021  (เวราอาฆาต) (/Ch.8) as Paen (Cameos) (แผน (รับเชิญ)) 
 2022 Mummy Tee Rak (มามี้ที่รัก) (/Ch.3) as Kroo Sou (Cameos) (ครูเสือ (รับเชิญ)) 
 2022 Fah Than Tawan (ฟ้า/ทาน/ตะวัน) (CHANGE2561/Amarin TV) as Thom Ya (Thom) (ถมยา (ถม)) 
 2022 Chart Payak Khom Nak Laeng (ชาติพยัคฆ์ คมนักเลง) (Coliseum Intergroup/Ch.7) as Phong (พงษ์)
 2022 Kheha Nang Khoi (เคหาสน์นางคอย) (Mhum Mai/Ch.7) as Boon (Cameos) (บุญ (รับเชิญ))
 202  (มวยสะดิ้ง หมัดซิ่ง สายฟ้า) (/Ch.8) as 

Television series
 2022 Club Friday The Series : Love Seasons Celebration Ep. Last Happy New Year (Club Friday The Series : Love Seasons Celebration ตอน The Last Happy New Year) (CHANGE2561/One 31) as Kroo Nong (ครูนง (พ่อของเอกภพ))

Television Sitcoms
 2022  (/One 31) as 

 Film 
 20  as  
 20  as  
 20  as  
 20  as  
 20  as  
 20  as  
 20  as  
 20  as  
 20  as  
 20  as 

Master of Ceremony: MC 
 Television 
 20 : ทุกวัน เวลา น. On Air

 Online 
 2021''' : - สามารถ VS ฉมวกเพชร กลับมาแก้แค้นแทนเพื่อนรัก On Air YouTube:มอสทะเล Channel

References

External links
 
 
 

Living people
1962 births
Flyweight kickboxers
Bantamweight kickboxers
Featherweight kickboxers
Super-bantamweight boxers
Featherweight boxers
World super-bantamweight boxing champions
Southpaw boxers
World boxing champions
World Boxing Council champions
Samart Payakaroon
Samart Payakaroon
Samart Payakaroon
Place of birth missing (living people)
Muay Thai trainers
Boxing trainers
Samart Payakaroon
Samart Payakaroon
Samart Payakaroon
Samart Payakaroon
Samart Payakaroon